Cyrtandra heinrichii, known as ha'iwale or lava cyrtandra, is a perennial flowering plant in the family Gesneriaceae. It is found on the Hawaiian island of Kauai.

Description
Cyrtandra heinrichii is a shrub that usually grows by waterfalls on walls of basalt. They are also found in shrubland and wet, tropical or sub-tropical forests dominated by Metrosideros. This species can usually be found with ferns at altitudes between 730m and 1,350m.

This species is closely related to Cyrtandra wawrae.

Conservation and threats
Cyrtandra heinrichii is listed as endangered by the IUCN. It occupies an area of 10km2. There are estimated to be between 250 and 1,000 mature individuals left in the declining population, fragmented into 9 subpopulations. Part of the species range lies within a Natural Area Reserve.

Damage to the plant by slugs and rodents, habitat destruction from wild pigs, and invasive plants species all pose a serious threat to this taxon. These invasive species compete with lava cyrtandra for resources. Such plant species include, but are not exclusive to:

 Erigeron karvinskianus
 Hedychium gardnerianum
 Clidemia hirta
 Cyathea cooperi
 Andropogon virginicus
 Rubus rosifolius
 Blechnum appendiculatum
 Pterolepis glomerata
 Erechtites valerianifolius

In addition, the decline of native bird and insect species has led to a decrease in pollination.

References

heinrichii
Endemic flora of Hawaii